The Panasonic Lumix DMC-LZ2 is a digital camera that was announced on February 8, 2005. It has Universal Serial Bus connectivity and a mass of 224 grams.  It was replaced in 2006 by the LZ3.  The camera has optical image stabilization, which alleviates camera shake problems.  The camera lacks manual control over shutter speed and aperture and has no optical viewfinder.

References

Superzoom cameras
LZ2
Live-preview digital cameras